Liquid are a British dance act, formed by Eamon Downes (a.k.a. Ame) and Shane Heneghan (a.k.a. DJ Model).

"Sweet Harmony", Liquid's first and best-known track, layered the house music of CeCe Rogers' "Someday" over rolling breakbeats. Initially released in 1991 on the self-pressed white label Liquid EP of 500 copies, it was re-released to a wider audience on XL Recordings in the following year.

The "Sweet Harmony" single was followed by The Future Music EP which included "Liquid Is Liquid". Following Heneghan's departure from the group after the first two releases, Liquid's reputation for recording alternative dancefloor fillers was cemented with "Time to Get Up" and the flamenco guitars of "One Love Family" - both of which were Mixmag 'singles of the week'.

The first three EPs were recorded with producer Jezz Wright at Blockhouse.

Liquid have achieved top 40 singles in the UK, and several European hits. The NME described the XL Recordings album Liquid Culture as "sophisticated, soulful techno." Liquid has performed live in many countries over many years. December 2007 saw the re-release of "Sweet Harmony" on XL Recordings with remixes by James Talk, Dave Spoon and Streetlife DJs. A drum and bass remix of "Sweet Harmony" by Danny Byrd was released in early 2010.

Discography

Albums
Culture (1995)
Energy Flows (2017)
Spacemonkey (2021)

Singles and EPs
Liquid EP (1991)
"Sweet Harmony" (1992) - UK #15
The Future Music EP (1992) - UK #59
"Time to Get Up" (1993) - UK #46
Liquid Love EP (1994) - UK #93
"Sweet Harmony"/"One Love Family" (1995) - UK #14
"Closer" (1995) - UK #47
"Strong" (1998) - UK #59
"Orlando Dawn" (2000) - UK #53
"Sweet Harmony" (2004) - UK #87
"Sweet Harmony" (Danny Byrd featuring Liquid) (2010) - UK #64

References

External links

Musical groups established in 1991
Breakbeat hardcore music groups
Hardcore techno music groups
English techno music groups
English house music duos
British trance music groups
English dance music groups
Electronic dance music duos
1991 establishments in the United Kingdom
XL Recordings artists